Battle of the Blades (or BOTB for short) is a Canadian figure skating reality show and competition that airs on CBC Television. The show originally aired for four seasons between 2009 and 2013.  It was revived for a fifth season in 2019.
It was first broadcast before a live audience at the historic Maple Leaf Gardens. With Maple Leaf Gardens under renovation however, the show was filmed at Pinewood Toronto Studios in season two.  The venue moved again in season three to MasterCard Centre located in Etobicoke, Ontario. For the revived fifth season in 2019, the venue was at the FirstOntario Centre in Hamilton, Ontario.  The venue changed again in the sixth season to the CAA Centre, located in Brampton, Ontario.

Description and history
The series resembles the international reality show Dancing with the Stars and is similar in concept to Dancing On Ice from the UK.  The biggest difference, and the show's main "hook", is that Battle of the Blades brings two very different styles of skaters together: hockey players are paired with prominent figure skaters to perform figure skating routines.  During the first two seasons, contestants were strictly male hockey players from the NHL, paired with female figure skaters.  In Season Three, Tessa Bonhomme was cast as the first female hockey player contestant, making her partner, David Pelletier the show's first male professional figure skating competitor.

In 2010, the French-language CBC's counterpart, Télévision de Radio-Canada, was planning to air a Quebec version, but did not decide if it would be an adaptation or a French-dubbed version. The show's executive producer thinks that it may also interest other countries like Russia.

On April 19, 2012, CBC announced that due to budget cuts by the Canadian federal government, Battle of the Blades had been put on "hiatus" and would not appear on the 2012 fall schedule, stating that the network could not afford the high production costs of the show.  Although not technically cancelled by CBC, executive producer John Brunton mentioned that the show may search for other network alternatives to produce future seasons.

On April 3, 2013, CBC announced that Battle of the Blades would return in Fall 2013 after a one-year hiatus.

With the loss of Hockey Night in Canada rights to Rogers Media, Battle of the Blades was officially cancelled by CBC on April 10, 2014, due to federal budget cuts, declining advertising revenues and television ratings.
 In addition, CBC subsequently announced it will no longer compete for any professional sporting rights of any kind.

The CBC revived the show in 2019, in response to demand from the public.  The show was renewed for a sixth season for the Fall 2020 lineup.

Scoring and elimination structure

Scoring
Each judge can award a score of up to 6.0, as in official figure skating competitions.  The highest score a team can achieve in a performance is 18.0.

Elimination
In the first season, the team were scored on their Sunday night performance, but only as a reference guide for the viewers to vote on. The bottom two teams were ranked based solely on the lowest number of viewer votes. Viewers can either text, call or log onto the show's official website to cast their votes. On Monday, the bottom two teams are revealed and they skate their Sunday night program once more in the Skate-Off and are then scored by the judges. The team with the lower judges score from their Monday night performance is then eliminated.

The rules of elimination were slightly altered in the second season.  The scores from the teams' Sunday night performance are now added to the viewers' voting to determine the bottom two couples. Also, instead of scoring the bottom two teams on their Skate-Off performance, the judges are now just asked to vote on the team of their choice. The team with the fewer number of judges' votes is then eliminated.

Midway during the second season, it was announced that Week Five would be a "Second Chance" competition for the couples eliminated thus far in the season.  The team with the highest combined total of viewer's vote and judges score would be reinstated as of Week Six, re-joining the top four team in the competition.

Season three introduced the Judge's Save, which is a one-time use per season tool that needed the consensus of all judges that would reinstate a team that was eliminated that same episode back into the competition.

The Monday night results show was cancelled in season four, and therefore elimination takes place at the end of each Sunday night performance show from Week 2 onwards.  The judges score and viewer votes from the previous week determine the bottom two teams on the current week's show. The bottom two teams skate-off at the end of the episode, performing their new routines. The judges would then score their performances and the team with the lower judges score is then eliminated. Also, viewer voting starting this season is solely done on the show's official website. Each unregistered visitor gets one vote.  Registered visitors can earn additional votes by completing their profile and other activities and challenges on the website.

Cast

Hosts and judges
 Host
 Correspondent
 Judge
 Competitor

The show is hosted by Hockey Night in Canada's Ron MacLean and singer Keshia Chanté. Four-time World Figure Skating Champion Kurt Browning is an "Elite Battle Expert" correspondent, providing colour commentary. Browning had previously hosted from seasons 1 to 3, and was a judge in seasons 4 to 5. Virgin Radio 999 DJ Maura Grierson was added in season three as the "Battle Correspondent", providing viewers with a look backstage, but did not return in subsequent seasons of the show.

In season one, the head judge was Emmy Award winning choreographer and figure skater Sandra Bezic, with Olympic champion Dick Button being the other regular judge.  There was also one rotating guest judge each week from the world of hockey or figure skating.  Season Two saw the departure of Button and the addition of retired NHL player Jeremy Roenick as the second regular judge.  Season Four featured a completely new judging panel with Browning switching from hosting to judging, Olympic figure skating gold medalist and season one champion Jamie Salé, and former NHL player and season two competitor P.J. Stock, with no rotating guest judges.  Season five saw the departure of Salé, bringing back the rotating guest judges.  In the second week of competition, Stock swapped to become a contestant, filling in for an injured Colby Armstrong, and Armstrong took over as a regular judge in place of Stock. Season six saw another complete overhaul of the judging panel with Olympic ice dancing gold madelist Scott Moir, Olympic ice hockey gold medalist and season 5 runner-up Natalie Spooner, and Junior Canadian figure skating champion Elladj Baldé as regular judges.

Competitors
 Winner
 Runner-up
 Third place
 Eliminated First

Notes
a ^ Navarro's original partner for season three was Belak.  However, Belak died before the start of the season and Courtnall was brought in as the replacement partner for Navarro.
b ^ Afanasieva's original partner for season five was Armstrong, who suffered an injury before the season began. Stock - Afanasieva's partner in season two - took his place from Week 2 onwards, while Armstrong served as a permanent judge throughout the season.

Charity
Each couple represent one or two charities of their choice.  Depending on their placement in the competition, an increasing amount of money is then donated to their charity.  The winners of season one, Jamie Salé and Craig Simpson, had CAD 100,000 donated to Spinal Cord Research.  In season two, all competitors were guaranteed $25,000 donated to the charity of their choice and $100,000 for the winners Ekaterina Gordeeva and Valeri Bure.  In season three, the winners' charity will receive $100,000, second place will receive $35,000, third place will receive $30,000, and the other five charities will receive $25,000.

Season summaries

Injuries

Professionals
In season one, Marie-France Dubreuil suffered two injuries.  Before the season opener, she was accidentally dropped by her partner Stéphane Richer while performing a lift during rehearsals and landed headfirst onto the ice.  On the morning of the Week Six result show, she suffered from severe back pain and was unable to perform in the Skate-Off that night.  She fully recovered from both injuries and was fit to perform the rest of the season.
In season two, Anabelle Langlois tripped and fell with her partner, Georges Laraque while practising an on-ice twist during rehearsals on October 27, 2010.  Langlois, who was more than six feet in the air when she fell, complained of severe pain in her knees. She was rushed to the hospital for X-rays and required three stitches.  She still performed on October 31 for her Week Five performance.
In season six, Meagan Duhamel was injured while performing a twist with her partner Wojtek Wolski during practice for their week 3 routine.  As she landed from the maneuver, Duhamel collided with Wolski and hit her nose on his shoulder, resulting in a suspected fracture of the nose.  She was cleared to skate in week 3 of the competition.

Hockey players
In season two, Georges Laraque was hit near the left eyebrow by his partner Anabelle Langlois' skate when they both fell while performing a lift during rehearsals one day before the season premiere.  Laraque required twelve stitches but was fit to perform the next night.
In season five, Bruno Gervais suffered a torn right bicep when performing a choreographic slide in practice. Despite a lack of practice throughout the week, he went onto perform Week 6 with partner Ekaterina Gordeeva, with coach Paul Martini adjusting the choreography of both routines.

Television ratings

Awards and nominations

See also
Dancing On Ice
Skating with Celebrities
Strictly Come Dancing
Dancing with the Stars
Skating With The Stars

References

External links
 Official website
 
 Battle of the Blades Oct 09 interviews with the cast from Season One.

 
Figure skating on television
2009 Canadian television series debuts
2013 Canadian television series endings
2010s Canadian reality television series
2000s Canadian reality television series
2020s Canadian reality television series
Television series by Insight Productions